Penicillium parviverrucosum is a species of fungus in the genus Penicillium.

References

parviverrucosum
Fungi described in 2011